This is a list of fictional canines in animation, and is subsidiary to the List of fictional canines. It is a collection of various notable non-dog canine characters. Dogs can be found under animation in the list of fictional dogs. Wolves can be found under animation in the list of fictional wolves.

Coyotes

Foxes

Other

References

Animation
Canines